Jorge Iván Bocanegra born in Líbano, Tolima, Colombia on 23 March 1991 is a football player, who plays for Millonarios in the Categoría Primera A, as striker
.

Statistics (Official games/Colombian Ligue and Colombian Cup)
(As of November 14, 2010)

References

External links

1991 births
Living people
Colombian footballers
Deportes Tolima footballers
Millonarios F.C. players
Bogotá FC footballers
Association football forwards
People from Tolima Department